Mam na Gualainn (797 m) is a mountain in the Grampian Mountains, Scotland. It lies above Loch Leven near the village of Kinlochleven in Lochaber.

The mountain takes the form of a long ridge on the north side of the loch. Its most distinguished feature is its eastern summit.

References

Mountains and hills of Highland (council area)
Marilyns of Scotland
Corbetts